Blue Streak or Bluestreak may refer to:

Entertainment
 Blue Streak (album), a 1995 album by American blues guitarist Luther Allison
 Blue Streak (comics), a secret identity used by three separate Marvel Comics supervillains
 Bluestreak (comics), a fictional superhero character in the Marvel Comics series A-Next
 Blue Streak (film), a 1999 comedy film starring Martin Lawrence
 Blue Streak (soundtrack), the soundtrack album for the 1999 comedy film Blue Streak
 Blue Streak (Cedar Point), a roller coaster at Cedar Point in Sandusky, Ohio, United States
 Blue Streak (Conneaut Lake), a former roller coaster at Conneaut Lake Park in Conneaut Lake, Pennsylvania, United States
 Bluestreak (Transformers), several fictional robot superhero characters in the Transformers robot superhero franchise.
 BlueStreak (video game), the codename for the upcoming video game LawBreakers by Boss Key Productions

Transportation and military
 Blue Streak (missile), a British ballistic missile
 PSA Airlines (call sign) 
 Blue Streak (bus), a former bus network in Seattle, Washington
 Bluestreak, an Indonesian subsidiary of the Goodyear Tire and Rubber Company
 Bluestreak, a New Zealand railcar nickname; See NZR RM class

Other uses
 Bluestreak cleaner wrasse, a species of wrasse

See also
 Blue Streak McCoy, a lost 1920 American Western film
 Blue Steel (disambiguation)